Víctor Manuel Camacho Solís (March 30, 1946 – June 5, 2015) was a Mexican politician who served in the cabinets of presidents Miguel de la Madrid and Carlos Salinas. At first he was affiliated with the PRI, later with the Party of the Democratic Center and then with the Party of the Democratic Revolution.

Political career
Camacho Solís joined the Institutional Revolutionary Party (PRI) in 1965, and in 1988 he became that party's general secretary. 
Camacho met Carlos Salinas at the National Autonomous University of Mexico (UNAM), where they became close friends. Camacho followed Salinas's trajectory in the Planning Ministry under the administration of Miguel de la Madrid. In 1985 he was elected to the Chamber of Deputies, and in 1986 he was appointed to the cabinet as Minister of Urban Development. When Salinas took over the presidency in 1988, Camacho was appointed Head of Government of the Federal District (1988–1993), an important political post with jurisdiction over the nation's capital. In 1997, the post became elective. He was a contender within the PRI to be the presidential candidate, but Salinas chose Colosio instead. Salinas told Camacho that he would be appointed the Head of Government of the Federal District, a powerful post, but Camacho sought to be Minister of the Interior. Before he accepted the appointment, he made demands: complete control of the district attorney's office and the police, the right to participate in political reforms, and complete authority over the city, which Salinas acceded to. According to political scientist Jorge G. Castañeda, "Salinas ... perhaps did not realiz[e] the danger of being suddenly left without an effective minister of the interior and with an overqualified mayor in charge of the country's main city." He became famous because he delivered 9000 millions (old pesos ) to Andrés Manuel López Obrador in order to take away the protest on the zocalo in 1992 in Mexico City. This money never was clarified by Andrés Manuel López Obrador, he took the decision for the final destination for this money.

The Zapatista uprising 
On November 13, 1993, Camacho was designated Secretary of Foreign Affairs. Due to the Zapatista uprising, Luis Donaldo Colosio's assassination in March 1994, and Camacho's failed attempt to clinch the party's presidential nomination, Camacho broke with the PRI. The complicated relationship between Camacho, Salinas, Colosio and Ernesto Zedillo (who was selected to replace Colosio as the PRI's presidential candidate) was the source of many rumors surrounding Colosio's assassination. Salinas appointed Camacho as the negotiator for the government in peace talks with the Zapatistas.  He resigned as Chiapas Peace Commissioner on 16 June 1994 claiming that the PRI presidential candidate, Zedillo, sabotaged his efforts.

Later career
During Zedillo's presidency, Camacho stayed away from politics until 1999 when he announced his candidacy for the presidency for the Party of the Democratic Center, a party that he had co-founded with Marcelo Ebrard.

In 2003 he became a federal deputy in the Chamber of Deputies representing the Party of the Democratic Revolution.
 He was selected to serve as a plurinominal deputy through an indirect election. In 2012 he was elected to the Senate.

In 2004 he joined Andrés Manuel López Obrador's political campaign. He wrote a column in  the Mexico City daily El Universal.

He died in Mexico City on 5 June 2015, after a long battle with brain cancer.

References

1946 births
2015 deaths
Mexican Secretaries of Foreign Affairs
Members of the Chamber of Deputies (Mexico)
Mexican people of Asturian descent
Mexican people of Basque descent
Candidates in the 2000 Mexican presidential election
People from Mexico City
Institutional Revolutionary Party politicians
Party of the Democratic Revolution politicians
21st-century Mexican politicians
Deaths from cancer in Mexico
20th-century Mexican politicians
Members of the Senate of the Republic (Mexico)
Deputies of the LIX Legislature of Mexico